Solidarităţii is a residential district of Satu Mare in Romania.

References

Districts of Satu Mare